Ostwald may refer to:

 Friedrich Wilhelm Ostwald, the physico-chemist (awarded the Nobel Prize in Chemistry, 1909) 
 Ostwald's rule of polymorphism: in general, the least stable polymorph crystallizes first 
 The Ostwald Process, a synthesis method for making nitric acid from ammonia
 Ostwald ripening, a crystallization effect
 Ostwald color system
 Wolfgang Ostwald, chemist and biologist, son of Friedrich Wilhelm Ostwald. He studied colloids
 Martin Ostwald, a German-American classical scholar
 Ostwald (crater), a crater on the far side of the moon
 Ostwald, Bas-Rhin, a commune in the Bas-Rhin département in France

See also
 Oswald (disambiguation)
 Ozwald Boateng